Chang Bingyu (born 8 August 2002) is a Chinese professional snooker player.

Chang is one of ten Chinese players currently suspended from the professional tour amid a match-fixing investigation. In January 2023, the WPBSA charged him with fixing a match. Following his suspension, Chang posted a message on Weibo, alleging that he had been threatened by his compatriot Liang Wenbo, who also faces match-fixing charges.

Career

Early career

Chang Bingyu first started to play snooker aged 6. At the age of 10, he had his first maximum 147 break in practice. His father, Chang Xudong, sold the family house and quit his job as an engineer to help his son's career, and the pair practiced together. They moved to Guangdong, and Chang worked with British-born coach Roger Leighton at the Wiraka Academy.

His first tournament 147 was in Guangzhou, aged 14. The video was widely circulated on social media. He also won a Junior tournament in Guangzhou, beating Duan Yanfeng 5–1. After victories at U14 and U16 level in Xi'an and Taishan, Chang concentrated on U18 and U21 tournaments. In 2017, Chang won the China Youth Championship in Yangzhou, beating He Guoqiang 4–0.

Later that year, Chang had his first significant result in a senior event on the Chinese tour. By beating experienced professionals Mei Xiwen, Ju Reti and Chen Feilong, he reached the final of the Baoying Open, narrowly losing 5–4 to Cao Yupeng after recovering from 4-1 behind. Ding Junhui's former coach, Wu Wenzhong, said he thought Chang was ahead of Ding at the age of 15. The 7-times world champion Stephen Hendry also attended the tournament and said Chang was even better than he was at that age.

In 2018, Chang Bingyu won the IBSF World Snooker Championship, a leading amateur event. He beat He Guoqiang 8–3 in the final.

Chang Bingyu also received wildcard invitations to the World Open (where he beat Jimmy Robertson), the Shanghai Masters, the China Championship (beating Robertson and Robert Milkins), the International Championship and the China Open (where he beat Mark Davis).

In 2019 Chang had finished at the top of the China amateur rankings, thus qualifying for the World Snooker tour for the 2019–20 and 2020–21 seasons. He moved to England with his father, where he was at first based at the Q House Academy in Darlington, and then later at the Victoria Snooker Academy in Sheffield.

2019/20 season

Chang Bingyu's first match as a professional was a 4–2 win over Ian Burns in a Riga Masters qualifier. Unfortunately, a visa issue meant that he was unable to travel to Riga to participate in the main event. Chang's best win of the season was against Tom Ford in the World Open. He produced a 120 total clearance in the Shoot Out, which commentator Neal Foulds said reminded him of Mark Williams.

With the outbreak of COVID-19, the season was suspended, and Chang returned to China. He decided not to return when the season resumed, and missed the 2020 World Snooker Championship. He finished the season ranked 103.

2020/21 season

Chang began his second season needing some good results to retain his tour card. His best results came in the two most important tournaments. He reached the third round of the UK Championship, beating Sam Craigie and Mark Allen before narrowly losing to Zhou Yuelong 6–5. In the World Championship he beat Julien Leclercq and Tom Ford before losing a high-quality 'Judgement Day' encounter with Lyu Haotian 10–6, a match which contained 5 century breaks.

Chang Bingyu finished the season ranked 69, but his position on the 1-year list meant he qualified for a new 2-year tour card. After the season, rather than returning to China, Chang chose to stay in Sheffield to work on his game.

Personal life
When in the UK, Chang Bingyu lives in Sheffield and practices at the Victoria Snooker Academy.

Performance and rankings timeline

Career finals

Pro-am finals: 1

Amateur finals: 1 (1 title)

References

External links
Chang Bingyu at worldsnooker.com

2002 births
Living people
Chinese snooker players
Sportspeople from Qinghai
People from Haixi
21st-century Chinese people